Palpopleura albifrons is a species of dragonfly in the family Libellulidae. It is endemic to Gabon.  Its natural habitat is subtropical or tropical moist lowland forests.

References

Sources

Fauna of Gabon
Libellulidae
Taxonomy articles created by Polbot
Insects described in 1979